Manuel Romo Rodríguez (1920-1992) was a painter from Estación Torres, Sonora, Mexico.

Romo received his artistic training at the Academia de Artes Plásticas of the Universidad de Sonora, where he would later return as an instructor. Here he would become associated with other notable artists such as Mario Moreno Zazueta, Marth Petterson and Roberto Peña Dessens.  His works are mostly paintings, etchings and some ceramics. His early works concentrate on landscapes and still lifes. His later work concentrates on representing darker emotions such as pain, suffering and death.

His work has received various awards, mostly from the Salón Annual de Primavera of the Academia de Artes Plásticas of the Universidad de Sonora. His best known works include Miniaturas and a series called Éxodo. Romo died in 1992.

References

20th-century Mexican painters
Mexican male painters
People from Sonora
1920 births
1992 deaths
Mexican landscape painters
Universidad de Sonora alumni
Academic staff of Universidad de Sonora
20th-century Mexican male artists